Peel is an American indie rock band based in Austin, Texas that was active between 2004-2009. They released the album Peel, in 2007, and the five song EP August Exhaust Pipes, in 2008.

Members
Josh Permenter: guitar, vocals
Dakota Smith: guitar, vocals
Allison Moore: keyboards, vocals
Michael Rogers: bass
Anthony Castañeda: drums
Derrick Chaney: Drums

Discography

Albums
 Peel (2007) Peek a Boo Records

EPs
 August Exhaust Pipes (2008)

See also
Music of Austin

References

External links
 Peel (official site)
 Peel (Bandcamp)

Peek-A-Boo Records artists
Musical groups from Austin, Texas
Musical groups established in 2004
2004 establishments in Texas